George Dodington (c. 1662 – 28 March 1720) of Eastbury Park, Dorset was a merchant, office holder and Whig politician who sat in the English and British House of Commons from 1705 to 1720, under the patronage of Edward Russell, 1st Earl of Orford.

Early life and family
Dodington was the eldest son of John Dodington of Dodington, Somerset and his wife Hester Temple, daughter of Sir Peter Temple, 2nd Baronet of Stowe, Buckinghamshire. His grandfather Sir Francis Dodington had been granted in trust the profits of a commissionership of appeals in excise which fell to his son. When Dodington's father died in 1673, Sir Francis' second wife tried to claim these but Dodington's mother counter-claimed and as a result Dodington was appointed to a post on the commission.

Business activities
Dodington prospered and by 1688 was part owner of four ships. In 1690 he and his partners secured lucrative contracts for supplying clothing to the army. Also, by 1687 he had started to undertake occasional work for the Treasurer of the Navy - and was finally in the service of Admiral Edward Russell. In 1695, Russell appointed him his paymaster and office manager, as a result of which Russell, who became Earl of Orford in 1697, became a powerful patron throughout his career. Dodington was a commissioner for Greenwich Hospital in 1695, commissioner for taking subscriptions to the land bank in 1696 and was appointed trustee for Exchequer bills in 1697. His increasing wealth allowed him to become a significant subscriber under both posts. He married by licence dated 12 February 1697 Eleanor Bull, daughter of Henry Bull MP.

Political career
In the late 1690s, Dodington became a target of Lord Orford's enemies who smeared him with financial impropriety in his offices, as an indirect attack on his patron. Although he could argue in his own defence and was supported by the Whigs, he lost his offices as paymaster and trustee for exchequer bills, and spent five years sorting out Orford's accounts. At the 1705 general election, he was returned unopposed as Whig Member of Parliament for Winchelsea. Although his father on his death told him to sell the Winchelsea estate, he did not, and so maintained an electoral interest there. In 1706, he was appointed secretary to the English commissioners for the Union with Scotland and became a trustee for a loan to the Emperor. He was Chief Secretary for Ireland from 1707 to 1708 and represented Charlemont in the Irish House of Commons from 1707 to 1713. At the 1708 general election, he was returned again for Winchelsea and also for Bridgwater and chose to sit for Bridgwater. From 1708 to 1710 he was one of the Lords of the Admiralty.  He was returned again at Bridgwater in 1710. In 1711 he became a commissioner for taking subscriptions to the South Sea Company. However he was threatened with strong opposition at Bridgwater at the 1713 general election and had himself returned for Winchelsea instead. He became an Irish Privy Councillor in 1714 and Clerk of the Pells for Ireland in 1715.

At the 1715 general election, Dodington was returned unopposed as MP for Bridgwater. Also from 1715 he was Lord Lieutenant of Somerset. He became very rich and commissioned Sir John Vanbrugh to design a large mansion to be built on his estate in Eastbury.

Death and legacy
Dodington died on 28 March 1720 and left his estate to his nephew George Bubb, who assumed the surname of Dodington and commissioned the building of Eastbury Park.

References

 Robert Walcott, English Politics in the Early Eighteenth Century (Oxford: Oxford University Press, 1956)

1660s births
1720 deaths
Politicians from Somerset
Irish MPs 1703–1713
Whig (British political party) MPs
English MPs 1705–1707
Members of the Parliament of Great Britain for English constituencies
British MPs 1707–1708
British MPs 1708–1710
British MPs 1710–1713
British MPs 1713–1715
British MPs 1715–1722
Lord-Lieutenants of Somerset
Lords of the Admiralty
Members of the Privy Council of Ireland
Chief Secretaries for Ireland
Members of the Parliament of Ireland (pre-1801) for County Armagh constituencies